Kentucky Route 138 (KY 138) is a  state highway in Kentucky. It runs from KY 132 northeast of Dixon to U.S. Route 431 (US 431) south of Livermore via Slaughters.

Major intersections

References

0138
Kentucky Route 138
Kentucky Route 138
Kentucky Route 138